Digitel Mobile Philippines, Inc., doing business as Sun Cellular (or simply known as Sun), was a wholly owned subsidiary of Digital Telecommunications Philippines (Digitel), which in turn was owned by PLDT and is one of the Philippines’ largest mobile telecommunications companies. It was established by Digitel in September 2001 to provide wireless public and private telecommunications services. Sun Cellular was known for introducing unlimited call and text services in the Philippines.

History

Early History 
On August 7, 2000, Digitel was granted a permit by the NTC to establish and operate a Nationwide Cellular Mobile Telephone System (CMTS) using Global System for Mobile Communications (GSM) and/or Code Division Multiple Access (CDMA) technology. The following month, the company founded the Digitel Mobile Philippines, Inc. (DMPI) to assist in its wireless service.

On December 11, 2002, the government granted DMPI, through Republic Act No. 9180, the right to establish a permanent franchise to create and manage a wireless telecommunications service.  DMPI launched its wireless service, known as Sun Cellular, on March 3, 2003. From mobile telephony, Sun Cellular expanded its services to voice, messaging and international roaming services, to wireless broadband and value-added services for consumers and businesses.

Acquisition by PLDT 
In 2011, PLDT acquired Digitel, including Sun Cellular, from JG Summit Holdings.  Although PLDT also owns Sun's former competitor Smart Communications, the two networks initially remained separate entities with completely independent mobile network infrastructure and corporate management structures.

Transition to Smart (2016-2022) 

Since 2016, Sun has been integrated into the Smart network in terms of mobile network infrastructure and corporate management and has been transitioned into a Smart brand (vis-a-vis TNT). Aside from the migration of all Sun data users to its new parent by way of them having to change their Internet settings, postpaid subscribers have been migrated to Smart "in order to efficiently handle their needs following access of Sun customers to Smart’s ‘nationwidest’ network."

As of February 2020, Sun's logo has been changed to reflect it being a full-blown brand of Smart (i.e. "Powered by SMART").

On October 21, 2020, PLDT announced that Sun's prepaid service was integrated into Smart Prepaid, leaving its postpaid service under "Sun" branding. 

On April 25, 2022, Sun's postpaid service was merged with Smart Postpaid, resulting to the subsequent forced retirement of all Sun Postpaid plans and add-ons. Smart encouraged those planning to subscribe to Sun to instead take advantage of Smart Signature plans, while existing subscribers can either still use their current subscription plans or upgrade to Smart Signature. With the integration of Sun Postpaid to Smart and the deprecation of Sun's remaining social media assets, the Sun Cellular brand was officially retired by PLDT and Smart after two decades.

Awards
Most Promising Telecom Service Provider in Asia Pacific award in the 2009 Frost & Sullivan ICT Award in Singapore.
The Agora Marketing Company of the Year in 2009 Award for its excellence in pioneering intra-network unlimited services and revolutionizing the country's telecommunications industry practices.
The 2004 Philippine Marketing Excellence Award
The 2005 Silver Prize for Most Effective New Service Introduction and Top 25 Philippine Companies recognized by Business Mirror and Stern Steward & Co.
In 2011, Sun Cellular won the Philippines Mobile Service Provider of the Year from the Frost & Sullivan Asia Pacific Best Practices Awards in Singapore.

References

External links
Sun Cellular website
National Telecommunications Commission website

Smart Communications
Former JG Summit Holdings subsidiaries
PLDT subsidiaries
Mobile phone companies of the Philippines
Telecommunications companies established in 2003
Companies based in Quezon City
Philippine brands
2003 establishments in the Philippines
2022 disestablishments in the Philippines
Telecommunications companies disestablished in 2022